Michael Stafrace (born 4 October 1998) is a Maltese swimmer. He competed in the men's 100 metre breaststroke event at the 2018 FINA World Swimming Championships (25 m), in Hangzhou, China.

References

1998 births
Living people
Maltese male swimmers
Male breaststroke swimmers
Place of birth missing (living people)